Grevillea rogersoniana, commonly known as Rogerson's grevillea,<ref name=FB>{{FloraBase|name=Grevillea rogersoniana|id=2083}}</ref> is a species of flowering plant in the family Proteaceae and is endemic to a restricted area near Shark Bay in Western Australia. It is an erect shrub with spatula-shaped leaves with 3 to 5 teeth or shallow lobes on the end, and cylindrical clusters of reddish pink flowers, the style with a cream-coloured tip.

Both sides of the leaves are silky-hairy at first, but soon glabrous.

TaxonomyGrevillea rogersoniana was first formally described in 1964 by Charles Gardner in the Journal of the Royal Society of Western Australia from specimens he collected near Shark Bay. The specific epithet (rogersoniana) honours "Mrs. W. Rogerson", who directed Gardner to this species in 1961.

Distribution and habitat
Rogerson's grevillea grows in tall woodland or Banksia scrub on sand dunes in an area south of Shark Bay, in the Carnarvon, Geraldton Sandplains and Yalgoo bioregions of Western Australia.

Conservation statusGrevillea rogersoniana'' is listed as "Priority Three" by the Government of Western Australia Department of Biodiversity, Conservation and Attractions, meaning that it is poorly known and known from only a few locations but is not under imminent threat.

See also
 List of Grevillea species

References

rogersoniana
Proteales of Australia
Eudicots of Western Australia
Taxa named by Charles Gardner
[[Category:Plants described in 1964